Romolo Albert "Roy" Bernardi (born October 14, 1942) is an American politician from Syracuse, and  former United States Deputy Secretary of Housing and Urban Development (HUD).  He was nominated by President George W. Bush on June 24, 2004, and confirmed by the United States Senate on November 21, 2004.

Bernardi served as Assistant Secretary for Community Planning and Development at HUD; he was appointed as acting HUD Secretary on April 19, 2008, after the resignation of Alphonso Jackson. He served until administration nominee Steve Preston was confirmed on June 4.

In 1993, Bernardi was elected as the 51st Mayor of the City of Syracuse, New York, where he served from 1994 to 2001. Bernardi had previously served as the Syracuse City Auditor for five terms. He is a graduate of Syracuse University.

In December 2020, Bernardi was nominated to serve on the Board of Governors of the United States Postal Service, but no action was taken and the nomination was returned to the president.

References

External links
 "Roy Bernardi", U.S. Department of Housing and Urban Development Biography
Presidential Nomination: Romolo "Roy" Albert Bernardi

United States Deputy Secretaries of Housing and Urban Development
George W. Bush administration personnel
Mayors of Syracuse, New York
Syracuse University alumni
1942 births
Living people
New York (state) Republicans